George "Jook" Nicksich (May 5, 1928 – January 17, 1985) was an American football player who played at the middle guard, linebacker, and guard positions.

A native of Monessen, Pennsylvania, he played college football for St. Bonaventure.

He then played professional football in the National Football League (NFL) for the Pittsburgh Steelers during the 1950 season. He appeared in a total of 12 NFL games, all of them as a starter. He intercepted three passes for 31 yards. He was named rookie defensive lineman of the year in 1950, but he suffered a knee injury  that ended his playing career.

Nicksich owned and operated the Duquesne Hotel in Monessen, Pennsylvania, for several years. He also worked as a guard at the Westmoreland County Jail. Nicksich started to develop an alcohol addiction, eventually dying of liver failure in 1985 at Westmoreland Hospital in Greensburg, Pennsylvania.

References

1928 births
1985 deaths
Pittsburgh Steelers players
St. Bonaventure Brown Indians football players
Players of American football from Pennsylvania
People from Monessen, Pennsylvania